Calvin Potter is a former member of the Wisconsin State Assembly and the Wisconsin State Senate.

Biography
Potter was born on November 3, 1945 in Sheboygan, Wisconsin. He graduated from Sheboygan North High School and attended the University of Wisconsin-Sheboygan and Lakeland College.

Career
Potter was elected to the Assembly in 1974. Later, he was a member of the Senate. Previously, he had chaired the Sheboygan County, Wisconsin Democratic Party.

References

External links
 The Political Graveyard

Politicians from Sheboygan, Wisconsin
Democratic Party Wisconsin state senators
Democratic Party members of the Wisconsin State Assembly
Lakeland College (Wisconsin) alumni
1945 births
Living people